Myles Staunton (24 September 1935 – 22 June 2011) was an Irish Fine Gael politician and businessman from Westport, County Mayo.

He first stood for election at the 1969 general election for the Mayo West constituency but was unsuccessful. He was elected to Dáil Éireann as a Fine Gael Teachta Dála (TD) for Mayo West at the 1973 general election. He lost his Dáil seat at the 1977 general election but was elected to the 14th Seanad on the Administrative Panel. He stood unsuccessfully as the Fine Gael candidate at the 1979 European election for the Connacht–Ulster constituency. He was re-elected to the 15th Seanad in 1981.

He stood again for the Dáil at the 1989 general election but was not elected. He was elected to the 19th Seanad on the Industrial and Commercial Panel in 1989.

He died on 22 June 2011.

References

1935 births
2011 deaths
Fine Gael TDs
Members of the 14th Seanad
Members of the 15th Seanad
Members of the 19th Seanad
Members of the 20th Dáil
Politicians from County Mayo
Fine Gael senators